Byron Brown (born 1958) is an American politician and current mayor of Buffalo, New York.

Byron Brown may also refer to:

 Byron D. Brown (1854–1929), American businessman and politician
 Byron Paul Brown (1866–1947), New Zealand businessman

See also
 Byron Browne (disambiguation)